Glacier National Park may refer to:

Glacier National Park (Canada), in British Columbia, Canada
Glacier National Park (U.S.), in Montana, USA

See also
Glacier Bay National Park, in Alaska, USA
Los Glaciares National Park, in Patagonia, Argentina